A solar-powered desalination unit  produces potable water from saline water through direct or indirect methods of desalination powered by sunlight.  Solar energy is the most promising renewable energy source due to its ability to drive the more popular thermal desalination systems directly through solar collectors and to drive physical and chemical desalination systems indirectly through photovoltaic cells.

Direct solar desalination produces distillate directly in the solar collector. An example would be a solar still which traps the Sun's energy to obtain freshwater through the process of evaporation and condensation. Indirect solar desalination incorporates solar energy collection systems with conventional desalination systems such as multi-stage flash distillation, multiple effect evaporation, freeze separation or reverse osmosis to produce freshwater.

Direct solar desalination

Solar stills
One type of solar desalination unit is a solar still, it is also similar to a condensation trap. A solar still is a simple way of distilling water, using the heat of the Sun to drive evaporation from humid soil, and ambient air to cool a condenser film. Two basic types of solar stills are box and pit stills. In a pit still, impure water is contained outside the collector, where it is evaporated by sunlight shining through clear plastic. The pure water vapor condenses on the cool inside plastic surface and drips down from the weighted low point, where it is collected and removed. The box type is more sophisticated. The basic principles of solar water distillation are simple, yet effective, as distillation replicates the way nature makes rain. The sun's energy heats water to the point of evaporation. As the water evaporates, water vapor rises, condensing on the glass surface for collection. This process removes impurities, such as salts and heavy metals, and eliminates microbiological organisms. The end result is water cleaner than the purest rainwater.

Indirect solar desalination
Indirect solar desalination systems comprise two sub-systems: a solar collection system and a desalination system. The solar collection system is used, either to collect heat using solar collectors and supply it via a heat exchanger to a thermal desalination process, or to convert electromagnetic solar radiation to electricity using photovoltaic cells to power an electricity-driven desalination process.

Solar-powered reverse osmosis
Osmosis is a natural phenomenon in which water passes through a membrane from a lower to a higher concentration solution. The flow of water can be reversed if a pressure larger than the osmotic pressure is applied on the higher concentration side. In Reverse osmosis desalination systems, seawater pressure is raised above the natural osmotic pressure, forcing pure water through membrane pores to the fresh water side. Reverse osmosis (RO) is the most common desalination process in terms of installed capacity due to its superior energy efficiency compared to thermal desalination systems, despite requiring extensive water pre-treatment. Furthermore, part of the consumed mechanical energy can be reclaimed from the concentrated brine effluent with an energy recovery device.

Solar-powered RO desalination is common in demonstration plants due to the modularity and scalability of both photovoltaic (PV) and RO systems. A detailed economic analysis  and a thorough optimisation strategy  of PV powered RO desalination were carried out with favorable results reported. Economic and reliability considerations are the main challenges to improving PV powered RO desalination systems. However, the quickly dropping PV panel costs are making solar-powered desalination ever more feasible.

A solar powered desalination unit designed for remote communities has been tested in the Northern Territory of Australia. The "reverse-osmosis solar installation" (ROSI) uses membrane filtration to provide a reliable and clean drinking water stream from sources such as brackish groundwater. Solar energy overcomes the usually high-energy operating costs as well as greenhouse emissions of conventional reverse osmosis systems. ROSI can also remove trace contaminants such as arsenic and uranium that may cause certain health problems, and minerals such as calcium carbonate which causes water hardness.

Project leader Dr Andrea Schaefer from the University of Wollongong's Faculty of Engineering said ROSI has the potential to bring clean water to remote communities throughout Australia that do not have access to a town water supply and/or the electricity grid.

Groundwater (which may contain dissolved salts or other contaminants) or surface water (which may have high turbidity or contain microorganisms) is pumped into a tank with an ultrafiltration membrane, which removes viruses and bacteria.  This water is fit for cleaning and bathing.  Ten percent of that water undergoes nanofiltration and reverse osmosis in the second stage of purification, which removes salts and trace contaminants, producing drinking water.  A photovoltaic solar array tracks the Sun and powers the pumps needed to process the water, using the plentiful sunlight available in remote regions of Australia not served by the power grid.

Solar photo voltaic power is considered a viable option to power a reverse osmosis desalination plant. The techno-economics both in standalone mode and in PV-biodisel hybrid mode for capacities from 0.05 MLD to 300 MLD were examined by researchers at IIT Madras. As a technology demonstrator, a plant of 500 litre /day capacity has been designed, installed and functional there.

Energy storage 

While the intermittent nature of sunlight and its variable intensity throughout the day makes desalination during nighttime challenging, several energy storage options can be used to permit 24 hour operation. Batteries can store solar energy for use at night. Thermal energy storage systems ensure constant performance at night or on cloudy days, improving overall efficiency. Alternatively, stored gravitational energy can be harnessed to provide energy to a solar-powered reverse osmosis unit during non-sunlight hours.

See also

Solar desalination
Solar still

References

Solar energy in Australia
Appropriate technology
Water treatment
Solar-powered devices
Membrane technology